Brian Rose (born 15 February 1985) is a British professional boxer. He challenged once for the WBO light middleweight title in 2014. At regional level, he held the British light middleweight title from 2011 to 2012.

Amateur career
Rose began boxing aged 9 when Dad (Eddie) started him on the path of becoming a boxer due to his hyper activity. It was early on when Eddie was informed that his son was a bit of a natural and so it came to pass that his first amateur fight came just aged 11. He lost, but it didn't put him off and he went on to have 90 amateur fights winning 78 of them and boxing for England. Over 30 of these fights were in different places around the world, the most memorable being in New Delhi, India.

Rose became 6 time national champion, earned a bronze in the European cadet championships and loved every minute of the amateur boxing life and so he took the obvious but difficult decision to turn professional and concentrate full-time on being a boxer.

Professional career

Early career 
Rose's professional debut came on 14 December 2005 with a victory over Geraint Harvey at the Hilton Hotel in Blackpool. Another 14 bouts were fought and won (with the exception of 1 draw) before the moment in Brian's career that he describes as his 'lowest moment' whilst fighting for the Central Area Title. Having beaten Jason Rushton at the Bolton Arena in Bolton on 23 October 2009 to win the title, Rose was horrified to learn that Rushton had been rushed to hospital following his collapse in the dressing room after the 10th round stoppage. His opponent was placed in a drug induced coma whilst a bleed on the brain was repaired.  This had a detrimental effect on Rose's state of mind. In his next fight he was knocked to the canvas by Max Maxwell at the Leisure Centre Huddersfield. After Rose's only professional defeat to date, he fought Terry Carruthers at the Velodrome in Manchester before getting a shot at the vacant English Title.

English Light Middleweight Title
Rose earned a shot at the English title when he fought Lee Noble at George Carnall Leisure Centre, Davyhulme, Manchester on 21 November 2010. He won by unanimous decision after 10 rounds of boxing and was faced with the prospect of defending the title, 6 months later, against the undefeated Martin Welsh at Medway Park Leisure Centre, Gillingham on 13 May 2011. After another successful bout, this time a victory by TKO in the 8th round of the contest, Rose was given the opportunity of a shot at the British Title fighting Prince Arron.

British Light Middleweight Title
Rose fought Prince Arron on 3 December 2011 at Robin Park Centre, Wigan and was awarded a unanimous decision by a dominant points margin. 31 March 2012 saw the first defence of the title and a long overdue return to home soil with the fight taking place at Winter Gardens, Blackpool. The opponent the only man to have beaten 'the lion' Max Maxwell. Rose won  a convincing unanimous points decision after 12 rounds.

Next to take on 'the Lion' was Scot Kris Carslaw on 2 June 2012 at Bowlers Exhibition Centre, Manchester. Rose won what has been describes as a 'nip and tuck affair' although the Scot had been cut early in the fight in the 3rd round. In his next fight, which was described as a bout to keep the champion 'ticking over' Brian beat the former World champion Vivian Harris again at the Winter Gardens, Blackpool by way of 3rd-round knockout.

The 3rd defence of Rose's title came against former champion and mandatory challenger Sam Webb on 14 December 2012 again back on home soil at Winter Gardens, Blackpool. This was to be a spicy bout after Webb had accused the champion of evading him after a previous date had fallen through and Rose had fought Vivian Harris instead. On being accused by Webb as being 'a bottler' Rose responded, "I'm not a bottler, I'll fight anyone, I want the belt outright so fighting Sam Webb is perfect for me. I'd beat Sam 9 times out of 10 so why wouldn't I want that fight? ... he need to take his frustration out on promoters not me."
The champion won with a unanimous decision having provided the challenger with what was described as 'more eye catching work' an such retained the Lonsdale Belt.

WBO Intercontinental Title
After joining Eddie Hearn at Matchroom, Rose fought for the vacant WBO Intercontinental belt against faded former World Champion in Joachim Alcine. The bout was won by TKO in the final round and provided Rose with the 7th KO of his career. Although it was largely meaningless yet propelled him to 4th in the WBO rankings and applied pressure on the then-champion to give Rose a shot at the title.

Rose defeated Alexey Ribchev by unanimous decision at Bolton Arena Bolton on 29 June 2013.

WBO title fight
Rose faced the 5th ranked WBO contender, Argentine, Javier Maciel, in a world title eliminator at Motorpoint Arena, Sheffield on the undercard of Kell Brook v. Vyacheslav Senchenko.  Rose won by split decision with scores of 117-111, 116-113, and 113-115.  This win places Rose as the mandatory challenger for the winner of the light middleweight title fight between Vanes Martirosyan and Demetrius Andrade.
Brian Rose was dominated and knocked out by Demetrius Andrade in brooklyn New York at the Barclays center on 14 June 2014.

On 14 June 2014, fought Demetrius Andrade for the WBO light middleweight title. Andrade was in control for most of the fight, dropping Rose once in the opening round, and once more in the third round, before forcing a stoppage by the referee in round seven.

On 9 April, Rose fought Matthew Macklin. The first part of the fight belonged to Macklin, while Rose upped his worked rate in the second half of the fight. That would end up not being enough, as the judges scored the fight 115-111, 115-111 and 113-113 in favor of Macklin.

On 2 August 2019, Rose battled Anthony Fowler to a unanimous decision loss. Rose put up a good fight, showing he still has a lot left in the tank, but obviously well past his prime fighting years.

Personal details
Born in Birmingham in 1985, Rose moved to Blackpool at the age of 8 and began boxing aged 9. He is a father of 3 and partner to Danielle. He is cousin to former Manchester City and Everton defender Joleon Lescott.

Professional boxing record

External links
www.roseboxing.co.uk Rose's Website
Brian Rose - Profile, News Archive & Current Rankings at Box.Live

References

English male boxers
Light-middleweight boxers
Sportspeople from Blackpool
1985 births
Living people